Proxeny or  in ancient Greece was an arrangement whereby a citizen (chosen by the city) hosted foreign ambassadors at his own expense, in return for honorary titles from the state. The proxeny decrees, which amount to letters patent and resolutions of appreciation were issued by one state to a citizen of another for service as proxenos, a kind of honorary consul looking after the interests of the other state's citizens.

A proxenos would use whatever influence he had in his own city to promote policies of friendship or alliance with the city he voluntarily represented. For example, Cimon was Sparta's proxenos at Athens and during his period of prominence in Athenian politics, previous to the outbreak of the First Peloponnesian War, he strongly advocated a policy of cooperation between the two states. Cimon was known to be so fond of Sparta that he named one of his sons Lacedaemonius (as Sparta was known as Lacedaemon in antiquity).
 
Being another city's proxenos did not preclude taking part in war against that city, should it break out – since the proxenos' ultimate loyalty was to his own city. However, a proxenos would naturally try his best to prevent such a war and to resolve the differences that were threatening to cause it. And once peace negotiations were on the way, a proxenos' contacts and goodwill in the enemy city could be profitably used by his city.

The position of proxenos for a particular city was often hereditary in a particular family.

See also
 Hospitium
 Xenia

References

Bibliography
 Monceaux, P., Les Proxénies Grecques (Paris, 1885).
 Walbank, M., Athenian Proxenies of the Fifth Century B.C. (Toronto, 1978).
 Marek, C., Die Proxenie (Frankfurt am Main, 1984) (Europäische Hochschulschriften: Reihe 3, Geschichte und ihre Hilfswissenschaften, 213).
 Gerolymatos, A., Espionage and Treason: A Study of the Proxeny in Political and Military Intelligence Gathering in Classical Greece (Amsterdam, 1986).
 Knoepfler, D., Décrets Érétrians de Proxénie et de Citoyenneté (Lausanne, 2001) (Eretria Fouilles et Researches, 11).
 Gastaldi, Enrica Culasso, Le prossenie ateniesi del IV secolo a.C.: gli onorati asiatici (Alessandria: Edizioni dell'Orso, 2004) (Fonti e studi di storia antica, 10).
 Encyclopædia Britannica

External links

 

Ancient Greek titles
Ancient Greek law
Diplomacy